Villanova Mondovì is a comune (municipality) in the Province of Cuneo in the Italian region Piedmont, located about  south of Turin and about  east of Cuneo.

Villanova Mondovì borders the following municipalities: Chiusa di Pesio, Frabosa Sottana, Monastero di Vasco, Mondovì, Pianfei, and Roccaforte Mondovì.

Among the sights is the Church of the Contraternity of Holy Cross designed by Bernardo Vittone.

Demographic evolution

References

Cities and towns in Piedmont